The 2007 Cricket World Cup took place in the West Indies from 13 March to 28 April 2007, using the sports One Day International format.  A total of 16 teams participated in 51 matches throughout the tournament and were initially divided into four groups, with the two best-performing teams from each group moving on to a "Super 8" format. From this, Australia, New Zealand, Sri Lanka and South Africa won through to the semi-finals, with Australia defeating Sri Lanka in the final to win their third consecutive World Cup.

Events took place at eight venues, with four venues used in warm-up matches.

Four additional venues hosted warm-up matches.

References

External links
 2007 Cricket World Cup Grounds

Lists of cricket grounds
Venues, 2007 Cricket World Cup